Kim Ji-won (born October 19, 1992) is a South Korean actress. She gained attention through her roles in television series The Heirs (2013) and Descendants of the Sun (2016) before taking on leading roles in Fight for My Way (2017), Arthdal Chronicles (2019), Lovestruck in the City (2020-2021), and My Liberation Notes (2022). The success of Kim's television dramas throughout Asia established her as a Hallyu star.

Early life and education 
Kim Ji won was born on October 19, 1992, in Seoul and has an elder sister who is two years older than her. In middle school, she was scouted on the street, signed with an entertainment agency, and subsequently became a trainee for over three years while preparing for her debut. After graduating from Paekahm High School, she pursued her studies in drama in Dongguk University.

Career

2008–2012: Beginnings
Kim was trained in singing, dancing, and acting but eventually chose to pursue the latter. She was a background vocalist for the singer Younha, performing as a keyboardist and background vocalist in various performances as well as appearing in Younha's music video "Gossip Boy" in 2008. During this time there were plans for her to debut as a singer with the stage name "JessicaK". Prior to her official debut, Kim made an appearance in the drama Mrs. Saigon. Kim then officially entered the industry in 2010 in a commercial for LG Cyon's Lollipop 2 featuring the group Big Bang and thus became known as the "Lollipop Girl". She later appeared in a carbonated drink commercial in which she performed a song and dance number and became known as the "Oran C Girl". She was also called Little Kim Tae-hee due to her resemblance to the actress.

Kim's first role after her debut was the romance omnibus film Romantic Heaven, however she first gained attention as an actress after starring in the 2011 sitcom High Kick: Revenge of the Short Legged. She then appeared in another major television series in the musical drama What's Up. Kim then starred in the high school drama To the Beautiful You and headlined the horror film Horror Stories, playing a kidnapped high school student. Kim also appeared in Baek Seung Heon's debut music video "Till the Sun Rises" alongside JYJ's Kim Jae-joong.

2013–2016: Rising popularity and breakthrough
In 2013, Kim starred as one of the lead roles in the KBS Drama special Waiting for Love, about how four different youths with different views toward love start seeing each other  as well as the film Horror Stories 2, the sequel to the previous Horror Stories film, playing a student obsessed with black magic. 
The same year Kim co-starred in teen drama The Heirs, in which she played a chic and haughty heiress. The Kim Eun-sook-penned drama was viewed over one billion times on Youku and its popularity raised Kim's profile, winning her the New Star Award at the SBS Drama Awards.

In 2014, Kim starred in the crime thriller Gap-dong as a high school student and a webtoon artist. The same year, she played a supporting role in the KBS Drama special The Reason I'm Getting Married. In December 2014, Kim signed an exclusive contract with King Kong Entertainment.

In 2015, Kim starred alongside So Ji-sub in the romance web series One Sunny Day in 2015. The same year, Kim made a cameo appearance in TVN drama Hidden Identity as Kim Bum's girlfriend.

In 2016, Kim co-starred in another project written by Kim Eun-sook, KBS2's military romance drama Descendants of the Sun, playing an army surgeon. The drama was a pan-Asia hit with ratings peaking at 38.8% and winning the Grand Prize in television at the 52nd Baeksang Arts Awards as well being declared the Most Popular Show of the year by Korea Broadcasting Advertising Corporation. Its success brought Kim further recognition outside Korea. She hosted the year end KBS Drama Awards with Park Bo-gum and Jun Hyun-moo, where she won the Excellence Award. Kim also won the Best Supporting Actress award at the APAN Star Awards.

2017–present: Leading roles
In 2017, Kim was cast in her first leading role in KBS2's romance comedy drama, Fight for My Way alongside Park Seo-joon;  as a department store employee at the information desk who dreams of becoming an announcer. The series was noted for its realistic portrayal of struggling youths, friendship, and love, and closed with ratings of 13.8%, solidifying Kim's status as leading actress. Kim once again won the Excellence Award at the KBS Drama Awards.

In 2018, she starred in her first period role in the third installment of the Detective K film series, Detective K: Secret of the Living Dead. She played the role of a mysterious woman who loses her memory and takes part in the investigation. Kim, along with her Descendants of the Sun co-star Jin Goo made a cameo appearance in the historical drama Mr.Sunshine by Kim Eun-sook.

In 2019, Kim played the role of Tanya, who is the head of the Wahan tribe and Song Joong-ki's love interest in the historical fantasy drama Arthdal Chronicles. The drama served as a reunion project for Song and Kim, who both starred in the 2016 hit drama Descendants of the Sun. Although the series received mixed reviews, criticism for its similarities to other programs, and lower-than-expected ratings, it was renewed for a second season. Kim and Song, however, did not reprise their roles for the second season.

In February 2020, Kim signed with Salt Entertainment. Later that year, she starred in the web series Lovestruck in the City opposite Ji Chang-wook which premiered on Kakao TV in December 2020.

In April 2022, she starred in the television series My Liberation Notes, where she played an introverted employee struggling to escape from her mundane life. During its run, the series received modest but steadily-increasing ratings and drew attention for its writing and relatable scenarios.

In June 2022, Kim's contract with Salt Entertainment ended, and she decided not to renew. On September 29, 2022, Kim signed with HighZium Studio (formerly History D&C).

On December 5, 2022, Studio Dragon confirmed Kim's participation in the upcoming drama Queen of Tears (tentative title) slated for the second half of 2023. She will act as Hong Hae-in, the Queens Group's chaebol heiress.

Filmography

Film

Television series

Web series

Hosting

Music video appearances

Discography

Singles

Awards and nominations

References

External links 

 
 

Living people
South Korean film actresses
South Korean television actresses
South Korean web series actresses
Actresses from Seoul
1992 births